Ashtiani (آشتیانی) may refer to:

People
 Abbas Eqbal Ashtiani (1897–1956), twentieth-century Iranian literary scholar
 Ardalan Ashtiani (born 1982), Iranian football player, son of Ebrahim Ashtiani
 Ebrahim Ashtiani (1942–2017), Iranian football player
 Javad Ashtiani (born 1981), Iranian football player
 Sakineh Mohammadi Ashtiani (born 1967), Iranian woman released in 2014 after serving nine years on death row

Other uses 
 Ashtiani dialect, spoken around the city of Ashtian